Kerala Dinesh Beedi is a workers' cooperative in Kerala.

History 
The Cooperative was launched in 1969 with the help of assistance from T. V. Thomas, Minister for Industries in Second E. M. S. Namboodiripad ministry. This cooperative came up as a result of workers' resistance against the exploitation of private capital. From the 1940s the organised labour movement in Kerala has demanded the implementation of special legislation to help beedi workers from the misery of exploitation. The initiatives of A K Gopalan pressurised the Nehru Government to introduce Beedi and Cigar Workers (Conditions of Employment Act) in 1966. However, the decision to implement the Act was left to the choice of state government. This Act was implemented by  Second E. M. S. Namboodiripad ministry, hence Kerala became the first state to implement it. This provoked the private beedi companies like ganesh beedi and they shifted their operation from Kerala to Karnataka. This left thousands of workers unemployed. As negotiations with the company failed, the trade union movement in Kerala put forth the idea of developing a cooperative. As a result, the cooperative was inaugurated in 1969.

The  E.M.S. ministry invested Rs 1.35 million as share capital and sanctioned a huge working capital loan of Rs 7,00,000 to initiate the functioning of this cooperative.

GK Panicker IAS, the then Joint Commissioner of Industries Department played a crucial leadership role in shaping the institution.

In the mid-seventies,  Dinesh Beedi achieved a significant portion of Indian tobacco market and they increased their profit from Rs 50,000 in 1969 to Rs 44 crore by 1994-95. With a 70 times increase in production it reached 6.85 billion beedis per year during the nineties.

Awards 

 Fair Business Practice Award 2014 instituted by the ASSOCHAM (Associated Chamber of Commerce & Industry of India).
 Fair Business Practice Award 2015 instituted by the ASSOCHAM (Associated Chamber of Commerce & Industry of India).
 ICAI Award 2015 instituted by Institute of Chartered Accountants of India.

Further reading 

 Democracy at work in an Indian industrial cooperative: the story of Kerala Dinesh Beedi . Thomas Issac, Richard W. Franke and Pyaralal Raghavan. Ithaca: Cornell University Press. 1998

 Dynamics of industrial cooperatives: a study of traditional industries in Kerala. Pyaralal Raghavan. PhD thesis: Jawaharlal Nehru University. 1995. 

 When a Workers’ Cooperative Works: The Case of Kerala Dinesh Beedi. Mitu Gulati, T. M. Thomas Isaac and William A. Klein. UCLA Law Review 1417-1454 (2002).

References 

Cooperatives in Kerala
Companies based in Kerala
Economy of Kannur
1969 establishments in Kerala
Worker cooperatives of India